Cartilage is a quarterly peer-reviewed academic journal that covers research in the field of sports medicine, especially the musculoskeletal system with particular attention to cartilage repair, function, and degeneration. The editor-in-chief is Roy D. Altman. It was established in 2010 and is currently published by SAGE Publications on behalf of the International Cartilage Repair Society.

Abstracting and indexing 
Cartilage is abstracted and indexed in Chemical Abstracts and Scopus.

External links 
 

SAGE Publishing academic journals
English-language journals
Orthopedics journals
Quarterly journals
Publications established in 2010